Shehzad Khan is an Indian actor who appears in Bollywood films and TV serials. He is the son of popular Bollywood actor Ajit Khan. He has a son Faaris Khan born in 1995. He also has a beautiful daughter, Faaiza Khan. His first wife stays in Breach Candy along with her two kids.

Career
Khan made his acting debut in 1988 film Qayamat Se Qayamat Tak. He is better known for his role of "Bhalla" in 1994 film Andaz Apna Apna. He is also popularly known for his character Tiger in the hit TV serial Shaka Laka Boom Boom. He also sang and wrote an album called Asli Loin Mix along with Sony BMG. He also tried his luck in production by producing a film titled Funda Apna Apna (2010), which never saw the light of release. He has mostly played henchmen or sidekicks to villains, but is known for his comic style of acting. He is the son of the famous actor Ajit Khan.

Filmography

Television

References

External links
 

Indian male film actors
Male actors in Hindi cinema
Living people
1966 births
Indian people of Afghan descent